The Chinese History Museum Kuching is a museum in Kuching, Sarawak, Malaysia. The museum is about the history of the Chinese people in Sarawak.

History
The museum building was constructed in 1912 and was used to be the headquarter of the Sarawak Chinese Chamber of Commerce until 1921. It was later converted into the Chinese History Museum Kuching and officially opened to the public by Assistant Minister of Culture, Youth and Sports Yap Chin Loi on 23 October 1993. In 2010, the museum exhibition underwent renovation which now includes short videos.

Exhibitions
The museum displays various artifacts related to Chinese affairs of Sarawak during the White Rajahs era, such as musical instruments, jade, ceramics, photos etc.

See also
 List of museums in Malaysia
 Malaysian Chinese

References

1993 establishments in Malaysia
Buildings and structures in Kuching
Museums established in 1993
Museums in Sarawak